UR-144 (TMCP-018, KM-X1, MN-001, YX-17) is a drug invented by Abbott Laboratories, that acts as a selective full agonist of the peripheral cannabinoid receptor CB2, but with much lower affinity for the psychoactive CB1 receptor.

Pharmacology
UR-144 has high affinity for the CB2 receptor with a Ki of 1.8 nM but 83x lower affinity for the CB1 receptor with a Ki of 150 nM. UR-144 was found to possess an EC50 of 421 nM for human CB1 receptors, and 72 nM for human CB2 receptors. UR-144 produces bradycardia and hypothermia in rats at a dose of 10 mg/kg, suggesting weak cannabinoid-like activity.

Chemically it is closely related to other 2,2,3,3-tetramethylcyclopropyl synthetic cannabinoids like A-796,260 and A-834,735 but with a different substitution on the 1-position of the indole core, in these compounds its 1-pentyl group is replaced with alkylheterocycles like 1-(2-morpholinoethyl) and 1-(tetrahydropyran-4-ylmethyl).

Legality
The UK ACMD recommended that generic prohibition legislation be extended to include UR-144 in October 2012. The UK Home Office accepted the recommendation and enacted legislation to ban UR-144 as a class B drug along with a number of other drugs on February 26, 2013 as a part of The Misuse of Drugs Act 1971 (Amendment) Order 2013. 

UR-144 was detected in Korea, 2012. This  molecule is very close to KM-X1, MN-001, YX-17 and Kr-11.

UR-144 (Abbott patent) has been detected as an ingredient of synthetic cannabis smoking blends in New Zealand, and subsequently banned from sale as a temporary class drug on 6 April 2012. It has also been encountered in smoking blends and subsequently banned in Russia.

As of October 2015 UR-144 is a controlled substance in China.

UR-144 is banned in the Czech Republic.

Detection
A forensic standard of UR-144 is available, and the compound has been posted on the Forendex website of potential drugs of abuse. An ELISA immunoassay technique for detecting UR-144 in urine as part of general drug screens has been developed by Tulip Biolabs, Inc. An Homogeneous Immunoassay that runs on most Clinical Chemistry Analyzers and detects several UR and XLR synthetic cannabinoids has been developed and introduced by Immunalysis Inc. Pomona USA.

See also 
 AB-001
 AM-1221
 4-HTMPIPO
 FAB-144
 JTE 7-31
 JWH-018
 N-(S)-Fenchyl-1-(2-morpholinoethyl)-7-methoxyindole-3-carboxamide
 XLR-11
 Tetramethylcyclopropylfentanyl

References

Further reading 

 
 
 

Cannabinoids
Designer drugs
Cyclopropanes
Indoles
Tetramethylcyclopropanoylindoles